Sebastião Couto (born 17 December 1908, date of death unknown), known as Tunga, was a Brazilian footballer. He played in five matches for the Brazil national football team in 1937. He was also part of Brazil's squad for the 1937 South American Championship.

References

External links
 

1908 births
Year of death missing
Brazilian footballers
Brazil international footballers
Place of birth missing
Association footballers not categorized by position